The 1919 Princeton Tigers football team represented Princeton University in the 1919 college football season. The team finished with a 4–2–1 record under sixth-year head coach Bill Roper. No Princeton players were selected as consensus first-team honorees on the 1919 College Football All-America Team, but halfback Murray Trimble was selected as a first-team All-American by the Reno Evening Gazette, and a second-team All-American by Walter Camp.

Schedule

References

Princeton
Princeton Tigers football seasons
Princeton Tigers football